Pisonopsis is a genus of square-headed wasps in the family Crabronidae. There are about five described species in Pisonopsis.

Species
These five species belong to the genus Pisonopsis:
 Pisonopsis areolata (Spinola, 1851) i c g
 Pisonopsis australis Fritz, 1965 i c g
 Pisonopsis birkmanni Rohwer, 1909 i c g b
 Pisonopsis clypeata W. Fox, 1893 i c g
 Pisonopsis triangularis Ashmead, 1899 i c g
Data sources: i = ITIS, c = Catalogue of Life, g = GBIF, b = Bugguide.net

References

Further reading

 
 

Crabronidae
Articles created by Qbugbot